Tägliches Cincinnatier Volksblatt was a German-language newspaper which was founded in 1836 and was printed in Cincinnati, Ohio. The paper served the German population of Cincinnati until it published its last issue on December 5, 1919. The newspaper lost support during the WWI period and lost the support of brewing advertisers due to Prohibition. The paper was absorbed by the other Cincinnati German language paper the Freie Presse.

References

Defunct newspapers published in Cincinnati
German-language newspapers published in Ohio
1836 establishments in Ohio
1919 disestablishments in Ohio